Fernando Buyser, also known with his pseudonym Florpinas (May 30, 1879 – November 16, 1946), was a Filipino Visayan poet, writer, and bishop of the Philippine Independent Church. He was a prolific writer and best known as the inventor of the Cebuano sonnet form called sonanoy and as the pioneer in the study Visayan folklore.

Early life 
Fernando A. Buyser was born to a wealthy family, Don Gregorio Buyser y Virgeneza and Doña Eugenia Aquino y Gumba, on May 30, 1879 in Kalunangan (known previously as Nazaret) in the town of Merida in the province of Leyte. He grew up in Caridad, which was formerly Makahila, in the town of Baybay, Leyte.

Philippine revolutions 
Buyser, who was 17 years old, became secretary to the Leyte guerilla force leader, Laureano Kabilin during the Philippine Revolution 1896. During the Philippine-American War, he served under the commands of Filipino revolutionary leaders Pedro Samson, Pablo Vivira, and Joaquin Flordelis. He also was responsible in organizing the guerilla units in the towns of Inopakan, Hindang, and Hilongos in Leyte.

Priesthood 
After the revolutions, Buyser became a schoolteacher in Hibakungan, Hilongos and was engaged in various trades including a stint as officer in San Rafael II, an inter-island ship. After finishing his studies to be a priest in a seminary of the Philippine Independent Church, he was ordained by Manila Bishop Jose Evangelista in 1905 and then assigned in the towns of Almeria, Leyte and Placer, Surigao. Later, he married Doña Bruna Aranas in Leyte, becoming the first religious priest to be wed.

In 1930, he was ordained bishop by Gregorio Aglipay and this new role allowed him to travel in Visayas and Mindanao as well as to help in the religious reforms initiated by Aglipay. He became the bishop of the provinces of Cebu, Bohol, Leyte, Samar, Masbate, and Surigao and the head of the Venerable Supreme Council of Bishops of the church.

Writing 
He compiled Cebuano traditional oral poetry and old verse forms, which he published in anthologies that were considered seminal in Cebuano literature: Mga Awit sa Kabukiran: Mga Balitaw, Kolilisi, Mga Garay ug mga Balak nga Hinapid (Mountain Songs: Balitaw, Kolilisi, Verses, and Braided Poems) which was completed in 1911 and Mga Awit sa Kabukiran (Mountain Songs) which was completed in 1912.

He wrote over 20 books in various genres, was one of the early writers who wrote short stories and initiated the study of Visayan folklore through Mga Awit sa Kabukiran and Mga Sugilanong Karaan (Old Stories) in 1913. He also published a newsletter called Gacetta in 1897, and the Aglipayan periodicals Yutang Natawhan (Motherland) in 1904 and Ang Salampati (The Dove) from 1920 to 1924.

Poetry 
Buyser, who used Cebuano and Spanish in his writings, wrote prose narratives using the pseudonyms Alibangbang (Butterfly), Pareng Bayot (Gay Priest), or Buddy. As a Cebuano poet, he was best known as Florpinas. Ang Suga, the pre-war Cebuano newspaper by Vicente Sotto, published his first poem in 1906. His collections of poems are published in five books:

Balangaw: Mga Katapusang Tinulo sa Dagang ni Floripinas (Rainbow: Last Drops from the Pen of Floripinas)
Balangaw: Pungpong sa mga balak ni Floripinas ug Ubang mga magbabalak nga Bisaya kinsang mga sinulat ilang gipahinungod kang Floripinas (Rainbow: Collected poems by Floripinas and Other poets who have dedicated poems to Floripinas) 
Basahon sa mga Balak (Poetry Reader)
Kasakit ug Kalipay (Sorrow and Joy) 
Kasingkasing sa mga Balak: Pungpong sa mga Balak (Heart of the Poet: Collected Poems)

Impact  
He was credited for the invention of sonanoy, a Cebuano poetic form akin to the English sonnet, although alternative etymology was sonata nga mananoy (harmonious melody) due to the non-adherence to the sonnet's poetic structure. The innovation utilized in sonanoy influenced the works of next generations of Cebuano poets. According to critic Marjorie Evasco, "The themes of Buyser's poetry lay very much within the tradition of pastoral and Romantic poetry where nature and the ordinary lives of ordinary people were celebrated. Buyser also wrote about the problems of human emotion and sentiment, but his mode of approach was influenced by the techniques of illustrative metaphor and of argument employed by the poets of the late English Renaissance."

Death 
Buyser suffered stroke in 1944 and died in Timamana, Mainit, Surigao, at the age of 67 on November 16, 1946.

External links 

 Cebuano Studies Center: Fernando Buyser
 Historical Photograph of Fernando Buyser | Southeast Asia Digital Library

References 

1879 births
1946 deaths
People from Leyte (province)
Filipino writers of bilingual works
Writers from Leyte (province)
20th-century Filipino writers
Cebuano writers
Visayan people
Cebuano language
Cebuano literature
Filipino poets